Clyde Lewis (born 25 September 1997) is an Australian competitive swimmer. He currently represents the Cali Condors which is part of the International Swimming League. Lewis won the gold medal in the 400 metre individual medley at the 2018 Commonwealth Games despite only gaining a place in the competition because another swimmer Mitch Larkin dropped out. He also bronze medaled in the 200 m individual medley. He also won the gold medal in the 200 metre individual medley at the 2015 FINA World Junior Swimming Championships. He also won a silver medal in the 4 × 200 m freestyle, swimming the second leg. Lewis competed at the 2015 Commonwealth Youth Games where he brought back a total of 8 medals, 5 of them being gold. There, he also set a personal best time in the 50 metre backstroke and the 400 m individual medley.

References

External links 
 
 

1997 births
Australian male backstroke swimmers
Australian male medley swimmers
Commonwealth Games medallists in swimming
Commonwealth Games gold medallists for Australia
Living people
Australian male freestyle swimmers
Swimmers at the 2018 Commonwealth Games
Swimmers from Brisbane
World Aquatics Championships medalists in swimming
Medalists at the FINA World Swimming Championships (25 m)
21st-century Australian people
Medallists at the 2018 Commonwealth Games